Malberg is a municipality in the district of Bitburg-Prüm, in Rhineland-Palatinate, western Germany.

References

External links
  
 Malberg at the Bitburger Land website www.bitburgerland.de 

Bitburg-Prüm